Ľubica Čekovská (Ľubica Salamon-Čekovská, Ľubica Malachovská-Čekovská; born March 16, 1975, Humenné) is a Slovak composer and pianist.

Biography 
Čekovská studied at the Academy of Performing Arts in Bratislava and the Royal Academy of Music in London. Her works have been featured at ISCM World Music Days festivals (2009, Sweden; 2013, Slovakia) and Prague Spring festivals (2006, 2013, 2015). She was awarded the Ján Levoslav Bella Prize for her piano concerto Two Portraits (2003), and the 2012 SOZA Award for international performances of Slovak music.

Čekovská works in a variety of genres, including composing for film, television, and theatre. She is represented by the German music publisher Bärenreiter.

Her latest opera, Impresario Dotcom, was commissioned for the Bregenzer Festspiele in 2020, but postponed due to the coronavirus outbreak. Čekovská then created a special abridged version for the restructured Festtage im Festspielhaus event in August 2020.

Works 
Čekovská assigned opus numbers to early works, but stopped using them after Op. 12 in 2000.

Operas 
 As Time Goes By (2005)
 Collaborative work by Čekovská, Marius Baranauskas, Age Hirv, Marios Joannou Elia, and Sean Reed. Libretto by Xavier Zuber. Premiered 29 September 2005, Staatsoper Hannover
 Dorian Gray (2013)
 Opera in 3 acts. Libretto by Kate Pullinger after the novel by Oscar Wilde. Premiered 8 November 2013, Bratislava. Slovak National Theatre, cond. Christopher Ward
 Impresario Dotcom (2020)
 Opera buffa in 4 acts. Libretto by Laura Olivi after Carlo Goldoni’s L'impresario delle Smirne (1759). Commissioned for the Bregenzer Festspiele, premiered in abridged version 20 August 2020.

Orchestral 
 Turbulence (Op. 11; 2000, rev. 2007)
 Shadow Scale (2006)
 Adorations (2006)
 Dorian Gray Suite (2011)
 Palingenia (2015)
 Etuda (2016)
 Cantus Simplicissimus (2018)

Large ensemble 
 Fragment and Elegies (1997, rev. 2004) – String orchestra
 Piece for String Orchestra (Op. 7; 1999)
 Arctic Descent (Op. 8; 1999) – Woodwind ensemble
 Fractal (Op. 12; 2000) – Chamber orchestra
 Postludium (2005) – Chamber orchestra
 Interrupted Line (2006, rev. 2008) – chamber orchestra
 Theatre Music (2011) – String orchestra

Concertos 
 Concerto Two Portraits (2003) – piano, orchestra
 Violin Concerto (2010)

Chamber music and solo instrumental 
 Composition for Trumpet and Piano (Op. 2; 1997)
 Brown’s Motion (Op. 3; 1997) – flute, bassoon, piano
 Fragment and Elegies (Op. 4; 1997) – solo accordion
 Dark (Op. 5; 1997) – oboe, piano
 One Minute (1997) – solo trombone
 The Song (2002) – cello, piano
 Kuckucks Winterlied (2005) – 4 cellos
 In Conversation (2006) – cello, bayan
 Musica homonensis (2007) – solo organ
 Lux in tenebris (2007) – trumpet, organ
 Duo Concertante (2010) – violin, piano
 Evenodd (2013) – wind quintet
 Nachtigalls Frühlingslied (2014) – 4 cellos
 A Midsummer Quartet (2016) – string quartet
 Fathers Downbeat (2018) – 4 basses, percussion
 Esaje [Essays] (2019) – viola, piano

Choral 
 Close Harmony (1997) – SATB
 On First Looking into Chapman's Homer (Op. 6; 1998) – SATB
 Three Fragments from Stabat Mater (2018) – SSAATTBB
 Liberte (2019) – Mezzo-soprano solo, SATB, orchestra

Voice and piano 
 At Day-Close in November (Op. 9; 1997) – Mezzo-soprano – Text by Thomas Hardy
 Der Tod und das Mädchen (Op. 10; 1997) – Baritone – Text by Matthias Claudius 
 Dialogues (2001) – Tenor
 Six Songs (2002) – Soprano

Solo piano 
 Five Miniatures (Op. 1; 1996)
 LaSiFaDo (2007)
 famisi (2007)
 Sonata Tensiona (2009)
 Four Movements (2012)

Film and television 
 Slečna Dušehojivá (2000) – TV movie
 Kruté radosti (2002)
 Kriminálka Staré Město (2010-13) – TV series
 Exponáty alebo príbehy z kaštieľa (2013) – Documentary
 Kolonáda (2013) – TV series
 38 (2014) – Documentary
 Jak jsme hráli čáru (2014)
 Čakáreň (2014) – Documentary
 Dvojčata (2015) – TV series
 Pirko (2016)
 Dubček (2018)
 Niečo naviac (2018) – Documentary
 Vlci (2018) – TV series
 Nero a Seneca (2019) – TV movie

References

External links 
 Official Website
 Ľubica Čekovská composer page at Bärenreiter
 Ľubica Čekovská Music Centre Slovakia
 Ľubica Čekovská CSFD.cz (Czech-Slovak Film Database) 
 

1975 births
21st-century classical composers
Women classical composers
Living people
Slovak composers
Slovak opera composers